Xalxalqışlaq (also, Khalkhalkyshlak, Xalxal-Qışlaq, and Khalkhal-Kyshlak) is a village and the least populous municipality in the Oghuz Rayon of Azerbaijan.  It has a population of 249.

References 

Populated places in Oghuz District